"Right on Time" is a song by American singer-songwriter Brandi Carlile, released on July 21, 2021 as the lead single from her seventh studio album In These Silent Days. The song received three Grammy Award nominations for Record of the Year, Song of the Year, and Best Pop Solo Performance.

Background 
The song was written when Carlile was quarantining in the Washington countryside during the early days of the COVID-19 pandemic. According to Carlile, the song's lyrics refer to events that happened during the pandemic: "babies were born, divorces were had, people died, and there's something really human about the obstacles that we've put in front of ourselves."

Live performances
Carlile performed "Right on Time"  on The Tonight Show Starring Jimmy Fallon on July 21, 2021, coinciding with the release of the music video. She also performed the song on The Howard Stern Show on October 5, 2021; Saturday Night Live on October 23, 2021, and at the 64th Annual Grammy Awards on April 3, 2022.

Music video
Carlile released the video for the song on July 21, 2021. The music video for the song was directed by American actress Courteney Cox. The video's look, which has been compared to David Bowie's aesthetic, was designed by stylist Maryam Malakpour. Since part of the video was shot underwater, Carlile had to take swimming lessons to overcome her lifelong aquaphobia.

Alternate versions
Carlile has released two alternate versions of the song. On August 27, 2021, she released a stripped-down version, "Right on Time (In Harmony)". On September 24, 2021, she released a live version of the single recorded at Red Rocks Amphitheatre with the Colorado Symphony.

Personnel
Brandi Carlile – vocals and piano
Tim Hanseroth – electric guitar
Phil Hanseroth – bass
Dave Cobb – acoustic guitar 
Shooter Jennings – organ
Chris Powell – drums
Tom Elmhirst – mixing

Charts

References

Brandi Carlile songs
2021 singles
American folk rock songs
Elektra Records singles